Cerecedo is a hamlet located in the municipality of Boñar, in León province, Castile and León, Spain. As of 2020, it has a population of 15.

Geography 
Cerecedo is located 50km north-northeast of León, Spain.

References

Populated places in the Province of León